Blayne Barber (born December 25, 1989) is an American professional golfer.

Barber was born in Tallahassee, Florida. He played college golf at University of Central Florida and Auburn University.  At UCF, he was an All-American his freshman year. In his two years at Auburn, Barber was a two time All-SEC honoree and named to two All-American teams. He holds the record for the lowest career stroke average in Auburn golf history at 70.83. He won two events as a collegiate as well as the 2009 Florida State Amateur. Barber also played on the 2011 and 2012 Palmer Cup and 2011 Walker Cup teams.

Barber turned professional in 2012. He played on the Web.com Tour through 2014. He picked up his first win in 2014 at the South Georgia Classic. He finished 16th in the Web.com Tour Finals to earn his PGA Tour card for the 2014–15 season.

At the 2012 PGA Tour qualifying school, Barber disqualified himself from the tournament for signing an incorrect scorecard.

Amateur wins
2009 Florida State Amateur

Professional wins (1)

Web.com Tour wins (1)

Playoff record
PGA Tour playoff record (0–1)

U.S. national team appearances
Palmer Cup: 2011 (winners), 2012
Walker Cup: 2011

See also
2014 Web.com Tour Finals graduates

References

External links

Auburn Tigers profile

American male golfers
UCF Knights men's golfers
Auburn Tigers men's golfers
PGA Tour golfers
Korn Ferry Tour graduates
Golfers from Tallahassee, Florida
1989 births
Living people